Sir Abdool Raman Osman State College, abbreviated as SARO SC, is a public secondary school for boys in Phoenix, Mauritius. It was found in 1996 as the Royal College of Phoenix and was renamed in late 1996 after Sir Abdool Raman Osman, the first Governor-General of Mauritius. The school became a National College in 2007.

SARO SC admits students having achieved excellent results in the CPE examinations, and preparing them for the University of Cambridge O Level and A Level.

History 

The school welcomed its first students in 1996. It was converted into a Form Six school in 2002. In January 2006, consequent to a policy decision of the government, the school again started admitting pupils in Form 1. End of year 2007, the school became a National College and changed its name from Sir Abdool Raman Osman State Secondary School to Sir Abdool Raman Osman State College.

Infrastructural and sport facilities 
 Laboratories: Physics (3), Chemistry (3), Biology (3)
 Audio-Visual Room (0)
 Computer Rooms (3)
 Library (1)
 DC/DT Workshops (2)
 Basketball Grounds (1)
 Art Rooms (2)
 Volleyball/Badminton Courts (2)
 Gymnasium/Multipurpose Hall (1)
 Table Tennis Course (0)
 Lecture Theatre (1)
 Football Ground

See also 
 Education in Mauritius
 List of secondary schools in Mauritius

References

Further reading

External links 
 Official Facebook page
 Official School page on the Republic of Mauritius government portal

Secondary schools in Mauritius
Vacoas-Phoenix
Educational institutions established in 1996
1996 establishments in Mauritius
Boys' schools in Mauritius